"Sweet Melody" is a 2020 song by Little Mix.

Sweet Melody may also refer to:

 Sweet Melody, a 2010 album by Fiona Fung
 "Sweet Melody", a song by the Jets from the 1995 album Love People